Carthasis is a genus of damsel bugs in the family Nabidae. There are about five described species in Carthasis.

Species
These five species belong to the genus Carthasis:
 Carthasis decoratus (Uhler, 1901)
 Carthasis distinctus Harris
 Carthasis gracilis Harris
 Carthasis rufonotatus Champion, 1900
 Carthasis uhleri Harris

References

Further reading

 
 

Nabidae
Articles created by Qbugbot